The 2007 Pan American Women's Handball Championship was the ninth edition of the Pan American Women's Handball Championship, which took place in Santo Domingo from 31 May to 4 June 2007. It acted as the American qualifying tournament for the 2007 World Women's Handball Championship.

Participating teams

Teams

Preliminary round
All times are local (UTC−4).

Group A

Group B

Placement 5th–8th

Seventh place game

Fifth place game

Final round

Semifinals

Bronze medal match

Gold medal match

Final standing

References
Results at todor66

Pan American Women's Handball Championship
Pan American Women's Handball Championship
Pan American Women's Handball Championships
International handball competitions hosted by the Dominican Republic
Sports competitions in Santo Domingo
21st century in Santo Domingo
May 2007 sports events in North America
June 2007 sports events in North America
2007 in Dominican Republic women's sport